Urias or Urías is the Spanish word for Uriah. It may also refer to

Urías, a Hispanic surname (includes a list of notable people with this surname)
Uriaș, a Romanian-language designation of giants
Urias (footballer) (born Lucas Xavier Urias in 1998), Brazilian football player
Urias McGill (c.1823–1866), African-American businessman 
Urias, Mazatlán, the location of an 1847 battle of the Mexican–American War

See also
Uria (disambiguation)